The Men's 100 metre freestyle S10 event at the 2010 Commonwealth Games took place on 8 October 2010, at the SPM Swimming Pool Complex, Delhi. In this event, Benoît Huot of Canada and Matthew John Cowdrey of Australia created games record in S10 and S9 categories respectively.

Records

Heats

Heat 1

Heat 2

Finals

References

Aquatics at the 2010 Commonwealth Games